The Mark Center Building is a United States military installation and office building in Alexandria, Virginia. It is operated by the Washington Headquarters Services (WHS) of the United States Department of Defense (DoD), and provides office space for several other DoD agencies.  The name of the site refers to the "Mark Center" property development in which it is located, at the intersection of Seminary Road and Beauregard Street at the Interstate 395 interchange. 

Sixteen acres of the site were sold to the federal government and are administratively considered part of Fort Belvoir. It is the tallest building constructed by the Army Corps of Engineers.

History
The site was selected in September 2008 as a result of the 2005 round of Base Realignment and Closures (BRAC), and is also referred to as BRAC-133. The 2005 BRAC process mandated a move of many DoD offices from leased office space to secure sites that could meet DoD's high anti-terrorism security standards.

Federal employees began moving to the center in August 2011, with the move scheduled to be complete by January 2013.  The project has been controversial in the region because of potential traffic impacts: many of the approximately 6,500 employees who will be relocated to the site were formerly located in Metro-accessible locations such as Crystal City, Virginia, and office buildings in Washington, D.C., itself, but must commute by car or bus to the new site via a highway that already handled 200,000 vehicles per day.

References

Buildings and structures in Alexandria, Virginia
Government buildings completed in 2012